Rami Heuberger (Hebrew: רמי הויברגר; born October 12, 1963) is an Israeli  director, actor and entertainer.

Biography

Career in the theater 
After his army service, Heuberger studied acting at Nissan Nativ's acting studio in Tel Aviv. At the end of his studies, Heuberger participated in several theater plays, among them Macbeth, One Flew Over the Cuckoo's Nest, Hamlet, Waiting for Godot, Le Bourgeois gentilhomme and Black Box. In 2007 the stage play Scenes from the Marriage premiered, which was directed by Heuberger and in which he also played. During the same year, Heuberger played in the stage play Anna Karenina alongside Evgenia Dodina, Alex Ansky and Yuval Segal. In 2008, Heuberger the second directed stage play premiered - Eling, which featured Dov Navon, Uri Hochman and Karin Ophir.

TV and film career 
In 1991 Heuberger played in the film Sarah Aronson, which was directed by Orna Ben Dor.
 
Heuberger's significant breakthrough in the field of comedy-satire occurred when he started appearing in the Israeli satirical sketch comedy television program Hahamishia Hakamerit alongside Shai Avivi, Dov Navon, Keren Mor and Menashe Noy. The show was broadcast between 1993 and 1997.

In 1993 Heuberger, played the role of Joseph Bau in Steven Spielberg's film Schindler's List. In the same year, he also played the role of Gabriel in the film Snow in August alongside Shai Avivi and Avigail Arieli.

In 1995, Heuberger played the role of Noam in Roni Ninio's film Actors, which tells the story of one year in the lives of graduates of an acting school who seek their breakthrough on the theater stages. in 1996, Heuberger played Claudio Orna in Yochanan Raviv's film Klavim Lo Novhim Beyarok.

At 1999, Heuberger played the role of Lt. Col. Alon 'Krembo' Sagiv in the cult Israeli film Operation Grandma.

In 2000, Heuberger participated in the Israeli drama series The Bourgeoisie, which was broadcast on the Israeli Channel 2.

In 2003, Heuberger played in Dover Kosashvili's film Gift from Above alongside Moni Moshonov.

In 2006, Heuberger played in the film Winning with Miki.

In 2006, Heuberger played Moishe Waldman in Hanan Peled's film Letters to America. That same year Heuberger participated as a regular member in the Israeli entertainment TV program Mo'adon Layla.

In 2007, Heuberger played himself in the TV series Bsorot Tovot. That same year, Heuberger also played Mr. Leibowitz in the film The Little Traitor and played the character of Abner in the Israeli television series Walking the Dog directed by Nir Bergman.

In 2008, Heuberger played Michael Neumann in the drama series In Treatment alongside Assi Dayan and Ayelet Zurer, and began to participate in the Israeli comedy talk show Ba'a Betov alongside Einav Galili.

In 2010, Heuberger began to play investigator Ido Wiener in the Israeli drama series The Arbitrator. That same year Heuberger also played the head of a yeshiva Rabbi Yair in the Israeli drama series Other Life, directed by Eric Rothstein. In addition, during 2010 Heuberger also played in Eitan Tzur's film "Naomi" alongside Melanie Peres and Yossi Pollak.

In 2011 Heuberger began playing a fictional Israeli prime minister named Agmon in the Israeli drama series Prime Minister's Children broadcast on Hot 3.

Film roles
The Beast (1988) - Helicopter Co-Pilot
Schindler's List (1993) - Josef Bau
Sheleg B'Ogust (1993)
Sahkanim (1995) - Noam
Klavim Lo Novhim Beyarok (1996) - Claude - The Cop
Matana MiShamayim (2003) - Bakho
Winning with Miki (2004)
Michtavim Le America (2006) - Moishe
The Little Traitor (2007) - Father
Miral (2010) - Belly Dance Club Customer
Hitpartzut X (2010) - Oded Safra
Ende der Schonzeit (2012) - Avi
Dawn (2014) - Gideon
Ma Kvar Yachol Likrot (2015) - Shalom Franko
Fire Birds (2015) - Tatoo Man
Vierges (2018) - Shmuel Siso

References

External links

Israeli male film actors
Israeli male stage actors
Israeli male television actors
Male actors from Tel Aviv
1963 births
Israeli entertainers
Israeli male comedians
Living people
21st-century Israeli male actors
20th-century Israeli male actors